John Tooby (born 1952) is an American anthropologist, who, together with psychologist wife Leda Cosmides, helped pioneer the field of evolutionary psychology.

Biography
Tooby received his PhD in Biological Anthropology from Harvard University in 1989 and is currently Professor of Anthropology at the University of California, Santa Barbara.

In 1992, together with Cosmides and Jerome Barkow, Tooby edited The Adapted Mind: Evolutionary Psychology and the Generation of Culture. Tooby and Cosmides also co-founded and co-direct the UCSB Center for Evolutionary Psychology. Cosmides and Tooby are the joint recipient of the 2020 Jean Nicod Prize.

Selected publications

Books
 Barkow, J., Cosmides, L. & Tooby, J., (Eds.) (1992). The adapted mind: Evolutionary psychology and the generation of culture. New York: Oxford University Press.
 Tooby, J. & Cosmides, L. (in press). Evolutionary psychology: Foundational papers. Cambridge, MA: MIT Press.
 Cosmides, L. & Tooby, J. (in press). Universal Minds: Explaining the new science of evolutionary psychology(Darwinism Today Series). London: Weidenfeld & Nicolson.

Papers
 Cosmides, L. & Tooby, J. (1981). Cytoplasmic inheritance and intragenomic conflict. Journal of Theoretical Biology, 89, 83-129.
 Cosmides, L. & Tooby, J. (1987). From evolution to behavior: Evolutionary psychology as the missing link. In J. Dupre (Ed.), The latest on the best: Essays on evolution and optimality. Cambridge, MA: The MIT Press.
 Tooby, J. & Cosmides, L. (1990). The past explains the present: Emotional adaptations and the structure of ancestral environments. Ethology and Sociobiology, 11, 375-424.
 Cosmides, L. & Tooby, J. (1992) Cognitive adaptations for social exchange. In J. Barkow, L. Cosmides, & J. Tooby (Eds.), The adapted mind: Evolutionary psychology and the generation of culture. New York: Oxford University Press.
 Cosmides, L. & Tooby, J. (1994). Beyond intuition and instinct blindness: Toward an evolutionarily rigorous cognitive science. Cognition, 50(1-3), 41-77.
 Cosmides, L. & Tooby, J. (2003). Evolutionary psychology: Theoretical Foundations. In Encyclopedia of Cognitive Science. London: Macmillan.
 Tooby, J. & Cosmides, L. (2005). Evolutionary psychology: Conceptual foundations. In D. M. Buss (Ed.), Evolutionary Psychology Handbook. New York: Wiley.

See also
 Behavioural genetics
 Human behavioral ecology
 Standard social science model

References

External links
Websites
 John Tooby's Website
 Center for Evolutionary Psychology

Articles and media
 "Them" - article on Cosmides, Tooby and Kurzban's research into the origin of racism, The Economist, December 13, 2001. 
 "Has Natural Selection Shaped How Humans Reason?" audio of a lecture at the Kavli Institute for Theoretical Physics, May 20, 1998 (with Cosmides).
 "Coalitional Psychology and Social Categorization" audio or video of a lecture at the Kavli Institute for Theoretical Physics, October 29, 2003 (with Cosmides).

Evolutionary psychologists
American anthropologists
Harvard University alumni
Human Behavior and Evolution Society
University of California, Santa Barbara faculty
Living people
Center for Advanced Study in the Behavioral Sciences fellows
1952 births
Jean Nicod Prize laureates